M. Balachandran (born 1 May 1947), who served as the chairman and managing director (CMD) of Bank of India (BoI) during the period 2005–2008, is a prominent banker of India. Before his appointment as the CMD of BoI, he was the executive director of the same bank. He is a post-graduate in science, and commenced his banking career in June 1970 as a probationary officer in Bank of Baroda, and has worked in different capacities, including as the senior manager (agriculture), chief manager (agriculture), regional manager, deputy general manager (priority sector) before he was elevated to the level of general manager and zonal manager of Bank of Baroda, Chennai Zone, Chennai. Thereafter, he was moved to Bank of Baroda, New York (US) as the chief executive. He was appointed as the executive director of Bank of India by the Government of India. Since 9 June 2005, he is serving as the CMD of BoI.

Contributions

During his tenure as chairman and managing director, Bank of India completed its 100 years and crossed many significant milestones in technology, rural finance and international banking. The bank successfully migrated to new tech-platform (CBS) in record time adopting a unique outsourcing model; which has had international acclaim. The bank embarked upon a major transformation through business process reengineering. In overseas operations the bank expanded by adding new branches in Belgium and China with three offices, and acquired a listed bank in Indonesia, the first-ever such acquisition by an Indian bank. The bank also instituted a trust 'Abhay' for financial education and credit counselling, an initiative, first of its kind in India.

He was the first chief of Gram Vikas Kendra at Bank of Baroda, at Pollachi, Tamil Nadu. Further, he is a postgraduate in agriculture science from Tamil Nadu Agriculture University, Coimbatore, South India.

He was a motivating force for all the directly appointed officers in the Bank of Baroda during his tenure in South Zone. He has excellent communication skills and a convincing personality.

Balachandran was the chairman of Mumbai-headquartered Star Union Dai-ichi Insurance Company, a joint venture of Bank of India, Union Bank of India and Japan's leading insurance company – The Dai-ichi Life Insurance Company Ltd. He is also a director of Institute of Banking Personnel Selection, Mumbai.

He was a director of Indo Zambia Bank Ltd., a joint venture in Zambia between Indian Public Sector Banks and Government of Zambia. He has been a director of ASREC (India) Ltd., an asset reconstruction company. Shri Balachandran was the chairman of BOI Shareholding Ltd., and director on the board of Agriculture Finance Corporation Ltd., and NABARD Consultancy Services Ltd.

Balachandran is also associated with several committees of RBI, IBA, NABARD and Govt. of India, notable of which are - High Power Expert Committee of Govt. of India for making "Mumbai as an International Financial Centre." 
Working Group on Agriculture - XI Five Year Plan, (GOI) 
RBI Committee on Lead Bank Scheme

He is now chairman of National Payment Corporation of India Ltd., and Small Industrial Development Bank of India [SIDBI].

He is a seasoned banker and a fine speaker.

External links
A news report
 https://web.archive.org/web/20120511073151/http://www.thehindubusinessline.com/industry-and-economy/banking/article1983703.ece
 
 http://www.thehindu.com/business/Economy/article905970.ece
 
 https://web.archive.org/web/20120803092249/http://www.india-inc.in/M.%20Balachandran%20.html
www.india-inc.in/M.%20Balachandran%20.html
 https://web.archive.org/web/20130412225122/http://www.iobbancon2011.com/Programme___Plenary_Session___Winning_the__War__for_talent_in_co_273.aspx?ALBUM
 http://www.thehindubusinessline.com/todays-paper/tp-money-banking/article988706.ece
 http://www.business-standard.com/special/bank06/bank06_04_6.htm
 https://web.archive.org/web/20120817032057/http://www.thehindubusinessline.com/industry-and-economy/banking/article3415652.ece
 http://www.npci.org.in/mb.html

1947 births
Living people
Indian bankers
Dai-ichi Life